Warren Clive Christian (17 August 1914 - 19 January 2003) served as Magistrate of the British Overseas Territory of Pitcairn Island twice, in 1950-51 and 1958-60. Christian was the son of Richard Edgar Christian and Adelia Carrie Jordan McCoy. He is related to numerous other island leaders, notably grandfather James Russell McCoy, uncles Charles Richard Parkin Christian and Matthew Edmond McCoy, brother Ivan Christian, and nephew and niece, Steve Christian and Brenda Christian.

References

1914 births
2003 deaths
Pitcairn Islands people
Pitcairn Islands politicians
Pitcairn Islands people of Saint Kitts and Nevis descent
Pitcairn Islands people of English descent
Pitcairn Islands people of Manx descent
Pitcairn Islands people of Polynesian descent
Pitcairn Islands people of Scottish descent
Pitcairn Islands people of Cornish descent